Hippeastrum cybister is a flowering perennial herbaceous bulbous plant, in the family Amaryllidaceae, native from Bolivia to Argentina.

Description 
The stem is nineteen inches tall.

Ecology 
The flowering season is Spring to Summer, with dormancy during the Autumn, Winter, and part of the Spring.

Taxonomy 
Originally described by William Herbert, and formally named by John Gilbert Baker in 1888.

Synonyms:
 Sprekelia cybister Herb., Edwards's Bot. Reg. 26: t. 33. 1840. (Basionym)
 Amaryllis cybister (Herb.) Planch., Fl. Serres Jard. Eur. 5: t. 455. 1849.
 Hippeastrum anomalum Lindl. ex Planch., Fl. Serres Jard. Eur. 5: t. 455. 1849.
 Hippeastrum deflexum (Rusby) L.B.Sm., Contr. Gray Herb. 124: 6. 1939.
 Lepidopharynx deflexa Rusby, Mem. New York Bot. Gard. 7: 214. 1927.
 Sprekelia cybister var. brevis Herb., Edwards's Bot. Reg. 26: t. 33. 1840.
 Sprekelia cybister var. subsexuncialis Herb., Edwards's Bot. Reg. 26: t. 33. 1840.

References

Sources 
 
 GBIF: Hippeastrum cybister
 Zuloaga, F. O., O. Morrone, M. J. Belgrano, C. Marticorena & E. Marchesi. (eds.) 2008. Catálogo de las Plantas Vasculares del Cono Sur (Argentina, Sur de Brasil, Chile, Paraguay y Uruguay). Monogr. Syst. Bot. Missouri Bot. Gard. 107(1): i–xcvi, 1–983; 107(2): i–xx, 985–2286; 107(3): i–xxi, 2287–3348.

Flora of South America
cybister
Garden plants of South America
Taxa named by John Gilbert Baker
Taxa named by George Bentham
Taxa named by William Herbert (botanist)